The tribe Millettieae is one of the subdivisions of the plant family Fabaceae.

The following genera are recognized by the USDA. In 2019, some genera USDA places in this tribe were moved to tribe Wisterieae; these are listed at the end.

 Aganope Miq.

 Antheroporum Gagnep.

 Apurimacia Harms
 Austrosteenisia R. Geesink

 Bergeronia Micheli

 Burkilliodendron Sastry

 Chadsia Bojer

 Craibia Harms & Dunn
 Craspedolobium Harms
 Dahlstedtia Malme
 Dalbergiella Baker f.
 Deguelia Aubl.
 Derris Lour.
 Dewevrea Micheli
 Disynstemon R. Vig.
 Fordia Hemsl.

 Hesperothamnus Brandegee

 Kunstleria Prain
 Leptoderris Dunn
 Lonchocarpus Kunth

 Margaritolobium Harms
 Millettia Wight & Arn.
 Muellera L. f.
 Mundulea (DC.) Benth.

 Ostryocarpus Hook. f.

 Paratephrosia Domin
 Philenoptera Hochst. ex A.Rich.
 Piscidia L.

 Platycyamus Benth.
 Platysepalum Welw. ex Baker
 Pongamia Adans.
 Pongamiopsis R. Vig.
 Ptycholobium Harms
 Pyranthus Du Puy & Labat

 Requienia DC.

 Schefflerodendron Harms

 Solori Adans.

 Sylvichadsia Du Puy & Labat
 Tephrosia Pers.

Genera moved to tribe Wisterieae:
 Afgekia Craib
 Callerya Endl.
 Endosamara R. Geesink
 Sarcodum Lour.
 Whitfordiodendron Elmer
 Wisteria Nutt.

Notes

References

 
Fabaceae tribes